Championship Manager 5 is the fifth installment of the popular Championship Manager series of football management computer games. It is the first game in the series to be developed by Eidos, after the much publicised split between Eidos and Sports Interactive.

Early difficulties 

The game was originally due for release in October 2004. However, the release date slipped to March, 2005, due to difficulties in coding the game from scratch. This allowed new rival, Sports Interactive's Football Manager 2005 a clear run to establish itself ahead of the release of CM5.

A release on the Macintosh platform was cancelled prior to release, again giving headway to its rival, Football Manager, which was made available for Mac as standard on a dual format CD-ROM (with the PC version).

Upon its release, the game contained an unusually high number of bugs. Even though BGS published a downloadable patch on the day of release, many users felt that CM5 was unplayable. Key problems included difficulties transferring players (either in or out of a club) and a very unrealistic match engine. Perhaps one of the biggest issues discovered by people purchasing CM5 was the fact that the player database was not particularly reliable. The database had been made 'for the fans by the fans' in previous games. This was probably the biggest strength of the CM brand. BGS had employed a professional firm to create much of the player database and they had apparently failed, despite the best efforts of the in-house research team.
Other issues also arose shortly after CM5 was released. Features like hotseat multiplayer games which, although confirmed as being included in CM5, disappointed some by their absence when the game arrived. Other small things such as player histories were also missing from the final product. Two patches are available that contain significant improvements to the game.

Console versions 

A scaled-down version of Championship Manager 5 was released on Xbox and PlayStation 2 in March 2005 along with a PlayStation Portable version, simply called Championship Manager. These are known to contain many of the same bugs and data errors as the PC version. All 3 console versions were developed by Gusto Games.

See also 

 Championship Manager (PSP)
 Football Manager 2005

External links 

2005 video games
Eidos Interactive games
PlayStation 2 games
Video game sequels
Windows games
Xbox games
Association football management video games
Video games developed in the United Kingdom